The four plantar metatarsal veins run backward in the metatarsal spaces, communicate, by means of perforating veins, with the veins on the dorsum of the foot, and unite to form the plantar venous arch (or deep plantar venous arch) which lies alongside the plantar arterial arch.

From the deep plantar venous arch the medial and lateral plantar veins run backward close to the corresponding arteries and, after communicating with the great and small saphenous veins, unite behind the medial malleolus to form the posterior tibial veins.

References

External links
 Overview at phlebologia.com

Veins of the lower limb